Stephen Randolph may refer to:

Stephen Randolph (born 1974), American baseball player
Stephen Randolph (historian), American historian, author and former Director of the Office of the Historian